The Curtiss-Wright Hangar, also known as Owens Field Municipal Airport Hangar, is an historic hangar located at Jim Hamilton – L.B. Owens Airport, Columbia, South Carolina. Built in 1929 by Curtiss-Wright, it consists of a central metal-clad barrel roofed storage area flanked on either side by flat-roofed wings.

It was added to the National Register of Historic Places in 1998.

In 2018, the restoration of the hangar was completed and the Hunter-Gatherer Brewery began serving a variety of craft beers and specialty foods.

References

Transportation buildings and structures on the National Register of Historic Places in South Carolina
Buildings and structures completed in 1929
Buildings and structures in Columbia, South Carolina
National Register of Historic Places in Columbia, South Carolina
1929 establishments in South Carolina
Aircraft hangars on the National Register of Historic Places